Zlatko Gall (born December 1, 1954) is a Croatian journalist, commentator and rock critic.

Gall was born in Split, and he graduated in art history and archeology at the Faculty of Humanities and Social Sciences at the University of Zagreb. Gall worked as a journalist in Slobodna Dalmacija from 1979 to 1995. After working for Tjednik and Feral Tribune weeklies, he returned to Slobodna Dalmacija in 2001.

Zlatko Gall is known as an advocate for rock music as an expression of urban culture and liberal values. He sees rock music as the antithesis of turbo folk which was associated with rural culture, conservative values, extreme nationalism and right-wing politics in former Yugoslavia. He often criticises pop and rock musicians who add elements of folk and turbo folk to their repertoire in order to make their music more accessible to the public. For example, in Slobodna Dalmacija he famously wrote an article lambasting the Ivan Zajc theatre in Rijeka for the decision to hire popular musician and advocate of turbo folk Severina Vučković for a production of the popular musical Karolina Riječka in 2003. He is one of the most respected rock critic in modern Croatia, and the author of "Rock encyclopedia".

References

Further reading
 Gall, Zlatko 

1954 births
Living people
Journalists from Split, Croatia
Croatian music critics
Croatian music journalists
Faculty of Humanities and Social Sciences, University of Zagreb alumni